Confessions is the sixth album, from the Christian rock band Pillar.  The album was released on September 22, 2009, by Essential Records.

Musical style and concepts
Rob Beckley commented about the album, "I had never had goose bumps listening to our own music before, but this album is just on a whole different level. We're indebted to everyone who played a role in pushing us out of our comfort zones. And I couldn't be more proud of our band."

Beckley further describes the concept as, "1 John 1:9 says, 'If we confess our sins, God is faithful and just to forgive us our sins and cleanse us from all unrighteousness.' Every song on this album could be broken down to 'If you just confess.'" Under this umbrella, recurring themes on Confessions include unity, commitment and perseverance.

When Blaine Barcus, VP of A&R, Provident Label Group talked about the album he spoke highly of it saying, "the album features songs which range from muscular, guitar-driven gut rock to beautiful, orchestral ballads. "Confessions is the kind of album that will make CHR radio listeners fans of rock music. The goal was that every single song on this album would be a great fit for radio, and I think the overall project reflects that goal. Rob and the guys poured themselves into the music and this project really delivers.”

Critical reception

Confessions garnered mostly positive reception by eleven music critics.

At AllMusic, Jared Johnson rated the album four-and-a-half stars, writing that "Pillar not just going through the motions but rather carving out a surprisingly intimate niche for themselves in the melodic rock world." Graeme Crawford of Cross Rhythms rated the album eight out of ten, calling it "not a groundbreaking album", but the band "retain their typical focus and deliver a strong album in their usual style." At Jesus Freak Hideout, Kevin Hoskins rated the album four-and-a-half stars, noting how "it’s a great record" on which "Pillar serves up a notable change that comes out nicely."

Kevin Kempton of CM Spin rate the album nine out of ten, calling this "very typical to past Pillar releases" on which "there isn't a bad song on the album", and "There is a lot to love about Pillar's Confessions." At Louder Than the Music, Suzanne Physick rated the album four stars, saying that this is "a great album". Thomas Jenkins of The Christian Manifesto rated the album three-and-a-half stars, stating that "final thoughts are most definitely positive."

At New Release Tuesday, Jonathan Francesco rated the album three stars, commenting that "Most of the songs had some high enjoyability to them". Roger Gelwicks giving a second opinion review at Jesus Freak Hideout rated the album three stars, stating that the album is "unfortunately mostly a forgettable hard rock experience." At Christianity Today, Andrea Dawn Goforth rated the album three stars, noting the album is "cookie-cutter" on which "tunes feel uninspired and become filler between the better songs."

Rob Vischer of Christian Broadcasting Network rated the album two-and-a-half spins, stating that "If mosh-pits and radio play measure success, Pillar's sixth album, Confessions, will be quite smashing. Unfortunately, after the fist-pumping melodies end and the driving guitarmonies fade, there's not much there. Unwrapping this album is like going on a blind date with a gorgeous airhead. Looks good. Seems fun. But not very clever." At The Phantom Tollbooth, Jerry Bolton rated the album zero tocks, cautioning that "Confessions is a couple bad covers, a handful of flagrant unoriginality, and an earfull of sounds you've already heard elsewhere."

Track listing
 "Fire on the Inside" - 3:22
 "Whatever It Takes" - 3:52
 "Secrets and Regrets" - 4:43
 "Better Off Now" - 3:26
 "Not Without a Fight" - 3:08
 "Will You Be There" - 3:53
 "Shine" (Collective Soul Cover) - 4:38
 "Call to Action" (Copper cover) - 3:48
 "Lose It All" - 3:29
 "You Are Not the End" - 3:35

Personnel
 Rob Beckley - vocals, rhythm guitar
 Noah Henson - lead guitar
 Rich Gilliland - bass guitar
 Joe Rickard - studio drums
 Taylor Carrol - drums at the time of the album's release

Drummer Joe Rickard, from the band Red, recorded all the drums for the album since Taylor Carrol hadn't joined the band yet. Former Adelitas Way and current Breaking Benjamin guitarist, Keith Wallen, contributed additional guitars and songwriting to "Call to Action" and "Lose it All". "Call to Action" was a song by Wallen's original band, Copper.

Charts

Awards
In 2010, the album was nominated for a Dove Award for Rock/Contemporary Album of the Year at the 41st GMA Dove Awards.

References

External links
 Official website
 Jesus Freak Hideout

2009 albums
Pillar (band) albums
Essential Records (Christian) albums